Diuris monticola, commonly known as highland golden moths, is a species of orchid that is endemic to south-eastern Australia. It is a common and widespread, late flowering species growing in grassland and woodland habitats at higher altitudes. It has a tuft of up to nine leaves at the base and up to four slightly drooping bright yellow flowers with dark streaks in the centre.

Description
There are two pimply, darker yellow callus ridges in the lower part of the mid-line of the labellum. Flowering occurs from November to January.

Taxonomy and naming
Diuris monticola was first formally described in 1998 by David Jones from a specimen collected near Tantangara Dam and the description was published in Australian Orchid Research. Jones derived the specific epithet (monticola) from the Latin mons meaning "mountain" and -cola meaning "dweller", referring to the montane habitat of this species.

Distribution and habitat
Highland golden moths is widespread and common in montane grassland, and snowgum woodland in the higher parts of southern New South Wales, Tasmania, the Australian Capital Territory and north-eastern Victoria.

References 

monticola
Endemic orchids of Australia
Orchids of New South Wales
Orchids of the Australian Capital Territory
Orchids of Tasmania
Orchids of Victoria (Australia)
Plants described in 1998